Per-Erik Johnsson (born December 4, 1958) is a Swedish ice hockey coach. He has been a head coach in the Swedish Hockey League (formerly Elitserien) with Färjestad BK, Skellefteå AIK, Timrå IK, and AIK IF.

References

External links
Per-Erik Johnsson's staff ptofile at Eliteprospects.com

1958 births
Living people
Swedish ice hockey coaches
Sportspeople from Karlstad